Sooke  is a district municipality on the southern tip of Vancouver Island, Canada,  by road from Victoria, the capital of British Columbia. Sooke, the westernmost of Greater Victoria's Western Communities, is to the north and west of the Sooke Basin. It is a regional centre for residents in neighbouring communities, including Otter Point, Shirley and Jordan River.

Tourism and recreation

Sooke's popularity as a scenic tourist destination has existed for generations. Well-known destinations in Sooke, such as Whiffin Spit Park, the Sooke Potholes Regional Park and adjacent Sooke Potholes Provincial Park, attract visitors both locally and from around the world. Sooke is also home to the Sooke Region Museum and Visitor Centre, which offers brochures, flat maps and in-person advice on how best to enjoy the region. The area's popularity has increased as a base for visiting the wilderness parks of Vancouver Island's southwest coast — the West Coast Trail and the Juan de Fuca Provincial Park which includes the now highly popular Juan de Fuca Marine Trail. Sooke, BC is also famous for its beaches just on the outskirts of its neighbouring communities such as Shirley and Jordan River. These beaches include Sandcut, French Beach, Fishboat Bay, China Beach, Mystic Beach and more.  Mystic Beach was rated as one of the world's Top-50 beaches in 2022.

Mountain biking is growing in popularity in British Columbia, and Sooke is establishing itself as a destination for the sport. Local advocacy groups such as the Sooke Bike Club are working to have areas such as Broom Hill set aside as parkland.

The Galloping Goose Regional Trail, part of the Trans-Canada Trail, runs through Sooke and is a popular cycling route to Victoria.

Arts community
The vibrant arts community is represented by the annual Sooke Fine Arts Show (established in 1987), which is renowned as Vancouver Island's premier such exhibition and attracts thousands to Sooke each summer by featuring the adjudicated art of local and regional artists. Sooke is known for its wealth of painters, writers, sculptors, potters, fabric artists, jewellery crafters and more. The Sooke Arts Council plays a large role in fostering art in the region and showcases local artists at its Church Road gallery space.

Real estate
In April 2022, an average single-family home in Sooke costs $887,500 based on the home price index, drawing from data from the Victoria Real Estate Board (VREB). By June 2022, that number (directly from VREB) increased to $938,000. The average home value as of July 1, 2022 as determined by BC Assessment was $831,000.

Demographics
A full summary of Sooke results from the 2021 Census is available from Statistics Canada.

Ethnicity

Religion 
According to the 2021 census, religious groups in Sooke included:

 No religion or secular perspectives (9,825 persons)
Christianity (4,755 persons)
Judaism (70 persons)
Buddhism (504 persons)
Islam (10 persons)
Muslim (50 persons)
Indigenous Spirituality (20 persons)
Hinduism (10 persons)
Sikhism (10 persons)

Politics 
The District of Sooke was incorporated as a municipality in December, 1999. It is part of the Capital Regional District.

Municipal 
Sooke is governed by a mayor and six councilors, who are elected every four years. The current council was elected on Oct. 15, 2022. Mayor Maja Tait

Councillor Al Beddows

Councillor Dana Lajeunesse

Councillor Jeff Bateman

Councillor Megan McMath

Councillor Tony St-Pierre

Councillor Kevin Pearson

Provincial 

Sooke in part of the riding of Langford-Juan de Fuca represented by John Horgan of the BC NDP, who first won in 2009.

Federal 
Federally the town is in the riding of Esquimalt-Saanich-Sooke, represented by Randall Garrison of the New Democratic Party. He was first elected in 2011.

Climate
Sooke has a Mediterranean climate, with warm summers and mild winters, defined by the Köppen climate classification as Csb. Although its precipitation is more like dry summer climates, its temperatures resemble oceanic climates as found in Ireland, for example.

Education
Sooke is a part of the School District 62 Sooke. There is one high school, Edward Milne Community School, and one junior high school, Journey Middle School. The four elementary schools in the area are John Muir (in the town's west end), Sooke Elementary (town centre), the French immersion Ecole Poirier (town centre), and Saseenos Elementary (east end). In 2018, SD62 announced it would be building Sooke River Elementary in the Sunriver neighbourhood. Continuing adult education programs are offered by the Edward Milne Community School (EMCS) Society, which also operates with day, evening and weekend programs. The closest post-secondary institutions are Royal Roads University and Camosun College's Interurban campus.

Neighbourhoods
(in order from east to west)
 North Sooke
 Saseenos
 Milne's Landing
 Sunriver Estates
 Sooke Town Centre or "Upsooke"
 Broom Hill
 Whiffin Spit
 Otter Point
 Kemp Lake

Neighbouring communities
 Metchosin - East of Sooke
 East Sooke - South of Sooke
 Otter Point - West of Sooke

Publications
 The long-established weekly newspaper is the Sooke News Mirror, edited by Kevin Laird and one of more than 70 Black Press Media community papers in B.C.
 Meanwhile In Sooke is a Facebook page with more than 26,000 followers as of January, 2023

Notable residents
 Canadian poet, novelist and playwright Marilyn Bowering lives in the Sooke area.
 Bryce Soderberg, bassist and vocalist for American rock band Lifehouse.
 J. Lee Thompson (1914-2002), British film producer and director (Cape Fear, The Guns of Navarone), died in Sooke.
 Kevin Wenstob, Canadian logger and subject of the reality TV series Big Timber.
 Darrel J. McLeod, Governor General's Award-winning author, lives in the Sooke area.

Notes

References

External links

Populated places on the British Columbia Coast
District municipalities in British Columbia
Populated places in the Capital Regional District
Greater Victoria
Juan de Fuca region